Pearsall is a suburb of Perth, Western Australia in the City of Wanneroo. Until the late 1990s it was the southernmost part of the suburb of Wanneroo.

Local parks
 Covert Park (10 Busch Pkwy)
 Salitage Park (5 Salitage Link)
 Willespie Park (62 Willespie Dr)
 Voyager Park (2 Voyager Link)
 Ashbrook Park (42 Ashbrook Ave)

Education
 Pearsall Primary School. Kindergarten through to Year 6. (95 Willespie Dr)

Businesses
There is one main shopping complex in Pearsall, Pearsall Shopping Center. The complex consists of Pearsall IGA, Great Kitchen Chinese Restaurant, Celebrations at Pearsall, Pearsall Medical Center, CK's Fish Cafe and Pearsall Pharmacy.

References

Suburbs of Perth, Western Australia
Suburbs of the City of Wanneroo